Lilya is a female given name. Notable people with this name include:

 Lilya Brik (1891-1978), Russian author
 Lilya Budaghyan, Armenian cryptographer
 Lilya Djenaoui (born 1997), Algerian volleyball player
 Lilya Hadab (born 1999), Moroccan tennis player
 Lilya Horishna (born 1994), Ukrainian freestyle wrestler
 Lilya Zilberstein (born 1965), Russian pianist